Richard Crispin Armitage (born 22 August 1971) is an English actor and author. He received recognition in the UK with his first leading role as John Thornton in the British television programme North & South (2004). His role as dwarf king and leader Thorin Oakenshield in Peter Jackson's film trilogy adaptation of The Hobbit brought him international recognition.

Other notable roles include John Proctor in Yaël Farber's stage production of Arthur Miller's The Crucible, Francis Dolarhyde in the American TV series Hannibal, Lucas North in the British TV drama Spooks, John Porter in the British TV drama Strike Back, Daniel Miller in the EPIX spy series Berlin Station and Guy of Gisborne in the British TV drama Robin Hood. He voiced Trevor Belmont in the Netflix adaptation of Castlevania. In 2020, he played the lead role in the Netflix miniseries The Stranger.

After graduating from the London Academy of Music and Dramatic Art (LAMDA), Armitage initially sought theatre work and was a member of the Royal Shakespeare Company (RSC). He turned to film and television roles when he noticed that leading stage roles went to actors with name recognition who could bring in patrons to fill venues. After twelve years away and having earned that name recognition, Armitage returned to the stage in 2014 taking his first leading role in a major production. He played John Proctor in the successful and critically acclaimed production of The Crucible at The Old Vic, and earned an Olivier Award nomination for Best Actor.

One of Armitage's trademarks is his baritone voice, which he has employed as a voice actor since 2006. While working on the TV series Robin Hood, he was asked to record audiobooks for the first season of that series. Armitage has recorded several audiobooks and has worked as a narrator on TV and radio shows and adverts. In 2022 Armitage ventured for the first time into video games, providing the voice of the Daemon Prince Be'lakor in Total War: Warhammer III.

In 2023 he made his debut as a fiction writer, with the thriller Geneva.

Early life and education
Armitage was born in Leicester, England, the younger son of Margaret, a secretary, and John Armitage, an engineer. Richard has an older brother named Chris. He attended Huncote Community Primary School in Huncote, Blaby District, Leicestershire and began secondary school at the local comprehensive school, Brockington College in Enderby.

At Brockington, Armitage pursued his interest in music – playing the cello in school and local orchestras, and learning how to play the flute. By fourteen, having secured a grant from the Leicestershire Authority, he successfully persuaded his mother to allow him to transfer to Pattison College in Coventry, an independent boarding school specialising in the Performing Arts so that he could focus on drama and dance.

Armitage has expressed gratitude for the lessons and opportunities Pattison College provided, saying "It... instilled me with a discipline that has stood me in good stead – never to be late, to know your lines and to be professional." By the time he finished school, he had achieved A Levels in music and English, and acting experience in local amateur and professional productions such as Showboat, Half a Sixpence, Orpheus and the Underworld (as Bacchus) and The Hobbit (as an elf) at the New Alexandra Theatre, Birmingham.

Career

1988–2003: Early work
After completing the programme at Pattison College in 1988, Armitage joined the Nachtcircus in Budapest for six months to obtain his Equity Card, a requirement at the time for entertainment professionals to work in the UK. Returning to the UK, he pursued a career in musical theatre – working as an assistant choreographer to Kenn Oldfield and performing in various productions, including the ensembles of 42nd Street, My One and Only, Nine, Annie Get Your Gun and as Admetus and Macavity in Cats. Armitage was also pursuing acting in dramatic theatre productions, including The Real Thing, Six Degrees of Separation and Death of a Salesman.

By 1992, he began to doubt if musical theatre was the right career path, so he enrolled at the London Academy of Music and Dramatic Art (LAMDA) in 1993 to further study acting. "I needed to do something a bit more truthful than musical theatre. For me it was a bit too theatrical and all about standing on stage and showing off. I was looking for something else, so that's why I went back to drama school."

After completing LAMDA's three-year programme, he returned to the stage as a supporting player with the Royal Shakespeare Company's productions of Macbeth and The Duchess of Malfi, as well as Hamlet and Four Alice Bakers with the Birmingham Repertory Theatre while taking a series of small roles in television and films. In 2002 he starred in the Charm Offensive's production of Use Me As Your Cardigan.

That same year Armitage appeared in his first major television role, as John Standring in the BBC drama Sparkhouse (2002). "It was the first time I went to an audition in character. It was a minor role but it was something I really got my teeth into... I couldn't go back. I knew I had to approach everything the same way." After this he took supporting roles in the TV productions of Between the Sheets, Cold Feet (series 5), and Ultimate Force (series 2).

2004–2010: Television success
In 2004, Armitage landed his first leading role as textile mill owner John Thornton in the BBC adaptation of Elizabeth Gaskell's North & South. The director and producers took a chance casting a little-known actor for their leading man. He was the first actor to audition for the role and the last person cast. North & South was an unexpected success. The BBC message boards crashed shortly after the telecast as a result of chatter about him and he was hailed as the new "Mr. Darcy" (referring to Colin Firth's "Mr Darcy" whom many regard as the definitive romantic leading man). Armitage did not perceive John Thornton as the ideal romantic leading man role and was surprised by the response. Instead, he said that he felt personally drawn to the role, as his father's family had been weavers. He cited Thornton's dualism as drawing him to the character. "The dichotomy between the powerful, almost monstrous, entrepreneur and this kind of vulnerable boy is exciting for me to look at."

In 2005, he played Peter MacDuff in Macbeth in the BBC's ShakespeaRe-Told series and appeared as a recovering gambling addict in one episode of Inspector Lynley Mysteries. He starred in The Impressionists, playing the young Claude Monet, and as Dr Alec Track in ITV's The Golden Hour, a medical series based on the London Air Ambulance. His first substantial role in movies was in the independent film Frozen.

In 2006, Armitage was cast as Guy of Gisborne in the BBC series Robin Hood, which was filmed in Hungary. "In order to sustain the character of Guy, you have to find the conflict within him. He's constantly pulled between good and evil, between who he wants to be and who he actually is. He could have been a good man, but he is forever dragged down by his fatal flaw – that he wants glory at all costs." Approaching the third series, he said, "I do love playing him, but with a character like Gisborne, if you give him what he needs, then in a way, it's over. That character is only interesting when he isn't getting what he wants, whether it's power, money or the girl." The third and final series of Robin Hood started on 28 March 2009.

Armitage appeared in a two-part 2006/07 Christmas/New Years special of The Vicar of Dibley, as Harry Kennedy, the vicar's new love interest (and eventual husband). He reprised the role in 2007 for Red Nose Day. On 8 April 2007, he played biker Ricky Deeming in the detective drama George Gently with Martin Shaw and Lee Ingleby. On 9 May 2007, he appeared in the BBC Four production of Miss Marie Lloyd – Queen of The Music Hall playing Marie Lloyd's first husband, Percy Courtenay. He also appeared in the Granada TV production of Agatha Christie's novel Ordeal by Innocence as the character Philip Durrant.

Armitage joined the cast of Spooks as the character Lucas North for series 7, which began on 27 October 2008 in the UK. Armitage notes that the character, who spent eight years in a Russian prison, has a personable exterior, but is psychologically damaged. "I love films with a combination of action and good characters. That's why Lucas is interesting as I get to play someone with a complex psychology who goes out there and tries to save the world." During the filming of series 7 Armitage allowed himself to be subjected to waterboarding to film a flashback sequence. In July 2010, Armitage completed filming of series 9, his final series.

On 20 May 2009, Armitage appeared in the BBC1 drama Moving On as John Mulligan.

In May 2010, Armitage starred as former SAS trooper John Porter in Strike Back (also known as Chris Ryan's Strike Back) for Sky1. Filmed in South Africa, Armitage found the main challenge of the role was to show how the character resolved being a trained killer with having a family and home life. "In the end it was the character I was attracted to, the story of a man who makes a decision under pressure and that decision has a knock-on effect on his whole life," he said. "He goes in search of atonement still believing he did the right thing even though it cost the lives of three of his friends... There's anger and there's injustice. It's like, 'I did the right thing, with the wrong outcome.'" By the time Sky1 and Cinemax decided to commission a second series of Strike Back called Strike Back: Project Dawn, Armitage had committed to The Hobbit and was unable to continue in the series. However, he appeared as a guest star in the first episode to resolve John Porter's fate.

It was his role as John Porter that led to his casting in Captain America: The First Avenger. American casting agents noticed posters of him as John Porter in London. Although unknown to them, they offered him the role of Nazi spy Heinz Kruger because he looked the part. Armitage accepted and shot his scenes in the autumn of 2010, after filming wrapped on Spooks, series 9. The film was released in July 2011.

2010–present: film success and beyond
On 21 October 2010, Peter Jackson announced Armitage was cast as Thorin Oakenshield in the three-film production of The Hobbit. Principal photography in New Zealand ran from March 2011 to July 2012, broken into three filming blocks with breaks in-between, and pick-ups were shot in the summer of 2013. All three films were released in December, starting with The Hobbit: An Unexpected Journey in 2012, The Hobbit: The Desolation of Smaug in 2013 and The Hobbit: The Battle of the Five Armies in 2014. Armitage thought it was a wonderful opportunity, as he grew up reading the books. Coincidentally, one of his first stage roles was playing an elf in a production of The Hobbit at the Alex Theatre in Birmingham. He describes the character of Thorin as being complex and flawed, "somebody that had doubts and that had fears, and there was a gentle side to him and a very perhaps lonely side to him." He notes the scene with Balin in Bag End shows the character's inner sensitivity and fear of failure, "failing where his father and his grandfather had failed as well."

After filming had been completed on The Hobbit, Armitage flew to Detroit, Michigan to film Into the Storm from July to September 2012. He starred as Gary Fuller, a high school vice principal and football coach with two teenage sons. The film from New Line was released in August 2014.

In March 2014, Armitage began the eight-week shoot of an adaptation of Bernard Hare's memoir Urban Grimshaw and the Shed Crew in Leeds, UK. He played "Chop" (the author's nickname), an ex-social worker, drunk and drug addict in Britain's lowerclass who befriends the hardened young delinquent Urban. Armitage explained his attraction to this role: "it ticks a few boxes for me: it"s based on a really interesting piece of literature, but also based on living people, who have been working with us on set." Urban and the Shed Crew premiered at the Leeds International Film Festival (LIFF) on 7 November 2015.

Armitage next appeared as John Proctor in The Old Vic's production of Arthur Miller's The Crucible. Directed by Yaël Farber and performed in the round, the play ran from 21 June to 13 September 2014. The production drew an unprecedented number of 5-star reviews and was a commercial success. For his performance, Armitage was awarded Best Leading Actor in a New Production of a Play by Broadway World:UK Awards 2014 and a Best Actor nomination for an Olivier Award. Due to worldwide demand to see the production, Digital Theatre captured the live performance to bring The Crucible to cinemas and for digital download. It was screened at cinemas on 4 and 7 December 2014 in the UK and Ireland, with further screenings in other selected territories in February and March 2015. Copyright issues prevented the film from being screened at North American cinemas. Digital Theatre made the digital download available worldwide on 17 March 2015.

In a September 2014 interview, Armitage revealed he would film his cameo role of King Oleron in Alice Through the Looking Glass in London after The Crucible closed. The film was released in May 2016.

Armitage spent four weeks in October 2014 filming Sleepwalker in the greater Los Angeles area. In this psychological thriller, Armitage plays Dr. Scott White, a senior MD at a sleep research center. Released on February 4, 2017.

DeLaurentiis Company tweeted on 13 January 2015 that Armitage was cast as Francis Dolarhyde in the TV production of Hannibal, written and co-produced by Bryan Fuller. Dolarhyde is a serial killer, a character type which Armitage had expressed interest in portraying. He filmed the series in Toronto, Canada from January to April, and the series aired from 4 June to 29 August 2015. Armitage appeared in the last six episodes of season 3, earning high praise, wide acclaim and several award nominations, including two wins.

After wrapping on Hannibal in late April 2015, Armitage joined his fellow Pilgrimage castmates who had already begun filming in Connemara, Ireland two weeks prior. He plays Sir Raymond De Merville, a 13th-century French Norman who is intent on foiling a group of monks escorting a sacred relic from Ireland to Rome. The cast and crew later moved to the Ardennes region of Belgium to complete filming, with Armitage wrapping one week earlier than the film wrap at the end of May.

News broke on 13 May 2015 that Armitage would star in Clearance, the first English language film by Finnish director Aku Louhimies and set to film in South Africa in November 2015. It is an action drama about a hardened mine expert named Ray (Armitage) and his pregnant partner (Naomie Harris) who are kidnapped in South Sudan.

In a June 2015 interview, Armitage mentioned his next projects included an Edith Wharton film and a true Irish tragic drama. Per agent David Higham, Bridget Cleary is likely the Irish drama.

On 12 July 2015, Armitage revealed he was about to start filming Brain on Fire in Vancouver, Canada. Subsequent news outlets provided more details about his role as "Big Man" Tom Cahalan, father of the protagonist in the true-life story of young journalist Susannah Cahalan's sudden descent into inexplicable madness and the eleventh-hour diagnosis by one doctor. Filming began 13 July 2015. Brain on Fire premiered at the Toronto International Film Festival (TIFF) on 14 September 2016.

Armitage landed the lead role of Daniel Miller in Berlin Station, an original spy series for Epix. His character, a cerebral analyst from Langley, is a newly anointed undercover CIA officer tasked with finding a mole in Berlin. Filmed in Berlin from November 2015 to April 2016, with some additional filming in the Canary Islands, the series premiered on Epix in the autumn of 2016.

On 13 July 2016, Roundabout Theatre Company announced Armitage was cast as Kenneth in the American premiere of Love, Love, Love by playwright Mike Bartlett. Love, Love, Love marks Armitage's first leading role in a theatrical play on an American stage. The off-Broadway play ran from 22 September to 18 December 2016 at the intimate Laura Pels Theater in New York City.

Armitage co-starred in the heist comedy Ocean's 8 (2018).

In February 2017, it was announced that Armitage had joined the cast of Julie Delpy's film My Zoe. In it he will play the role of James, the ex-husband of Delpy's character Isabelle. Their toxic marriage may be over but they are still in contact with each other as they co-parent their daughter Zoe. But when tragedy strikes this fractured family, Isabelle takes matters into her own hands. In February 2018, Armitage joined the cast of The Lodge, which began filming in early February. Armitage plays the leading role of Adam Price in Netflix's 2020 mystery thriller miniseries, The Stranger, which is based on the Harlan Coben novel of the same title. The series has been critically acclaimed, with a rating of 89% from Rotten Tomatoes.

In 2022, Armitage gave his first performance in a video game, appearing as the Daemon Prince Be'lakor in Creative Assembly's real-time strategy game Total War: Warhammer III. In October that year, Armitage’s debut novel, Geneva, a thriller, was published by Audible. Armitage and former Spooks co-star Nicola Walker narrate the audiobook.

Narration
Armitage was introduced to voice work while working on the TV drama Robin Hood in 2006. The BBC was publishing novels of the first four episodes of series one and asked Armitage to record the audiobook versions. In recent years, Armitage has also performed a great deal of voice work, such as reading poetry for various radio programs and starring as Robert Lovelace in BBC Radio 4's production of Clarissa: A History of a Young Lady in April 2010. He has recorded many audiobooks: six based on BBC's Robin Hood, Bernard Cornwell's The Lords of the North, three Georgette Heyer novels for Naxos AudioBooks (Sylvester, or the Wicked Uncle, Venetia, and The Convenient Marriage), David Copperfield by Charles Dickens for Audible Studios and Hamlet, Prince of Denmark: A Novel. He has narrated television documentaries such as Homes from Hell, Empire's Children, Too Poor for Posh School?, The Great Sperm Race, Forest Elephants: Rumble in the Jungle, Surgery School, and Elsa: The Lioness That Changed the World. In 2011, he provided the narration for a series about the Royal Navy flagship , 125 Years of Wimbledon: You Cannot Be Serious, and Fraud Squad. He has also provided the voice-over for many TV and radio advertisements, and stars as lead character Trevor Belmont in the Netflix animated series Castlevania.

Richard III connection
Armitage was hoping to star in a drama based on Richard III. Armitage was born on the anniversary of the Battle of Bosworth Field, where Richard III was killed and has said "I believe it is a great story, a socio-political thriller, a love story and a dynastic tragedy." He thinks the story has the potential to be told as a twenty-episode miniseries. A script has been in development since 2010 and "a lot of people... are interested [in producing it], but there is no one that will step on the gas."

Acting style
Armitage has described himself as a method actor. "Yeah, I suppose I am. In a way it's slightly lazy because it means you don't have to pretend – you just have to believe. As much as it's possible to be like that I suppose I kind of do step in and out, I'm not one of these people that can't talk to other people because I'm in my character, but I kind of do stay with the character, yeah. He's always there. It's like marinating something – you're sitting in a marinade the whole time." He has also spoken of dreaming in character while playing John Porter and Thorin Oakenshield. However, recently he rejected the label of "method actor." "I think I'm a concentrating actor. So in order to do my work in the course of a day, particularly with a character like this I have to concentrate. So it's about staying in the scene, staying with my head in the scene and attempting to keep the character with me. It doesn't mean I can't have a conversation or go and make a cup of coffee. But I actually stay with the character for 18 months."

He frequently speaks of developing and being drawn to dualism in his characters. "If I'm offered the role of the hero, I immediately look for the antihero within!... I see everything in terms of an outer skin and an inner skin." He creates "character diaries" with entire biographies for the characters he plays. "It was important to me to put in a background for my character that would be useful for the whole journey. A lot of that is secret and no one gets to read that. It's what is useful to me. If you are playing something long-running and a role that has a future [beyond the initial series], it's almost like you have to plant a garden which you will need to come back to at some point. If you don't put in early, it can jar with you."

Filmography

Film

Television

Theatre

Discography

Radio
 2007: BBC Radio 4: The Ted Hughes Letters, as Ted Hughes (29 October 2007)
 2007: BBC Radio 2: A War Less Ordinary, narrator (10 November 2007)
 2010: BBC Radio 4: Clarissa: The History of a Young Lady, as Robert Lovelace (14 March 2010)
 2010: BBC Radio 3: Words and Music: Symphony of a City as narrator (12 September 2010)

Voice-over
 2007: Channel 4: Empire's Children, as narrator (2 July 2007)
 2009: ITV1: Homes from Hell, as narrator (3 March 2009)
 2009: Channel 4: The Great Sperm Race, as narrator (23 March 2009)
 2010–11: Voice-over for Santander TV and radio adverts
 2010: BBC 2: The Natural World, Forest Elephants: Rumbles in the Jungle, as narrator
 2010–2011: Voice-over for Sky Sports HD TV and radio adverts
 2010: Voice-over for General Election 2010 Leaders' Debates radio adverts
 2010: Voice-over for BBC Winter Olympics TV and radio adverts
 2010: Voice-over for Alfa Romeo Mito TV advert
 2010: Voice-over for John Bull Jewelers radio adverts
 2010: ITV: Surgery School, as narrator
 2010: Voice-over for Hyundai ix20 TV advert
 2010: BBC: Lost Land of the Tiger, as narrator
 2011: BBC: Elsa: The Lioness That Changed the World, as narrator
 2010: Voice-over for ActionAidUK TV advert
 2011: Voice-over for Pilsner Urquell TV advert
 2011: Discovery Channel UK: HMS Ark Royal, as narrator
 2011: Eden Channel: Trouble in Lemur Land: Phantoms of the Forest, as narrator
 2011: BBC2: 125 Years of Wimbledon: You Cannot Be Serious, as narrator
 2011: Voice-over for LG Optimus 3D Smartphone TV advert
 2011: ITV: Fraud Squad, as narrator
 2011: National Geographic Wild: Leopards of Dead Tree island, as narrator
 2012: ITV: Fraud Squad, series two, as narrator

Podcast shows
 2018: Wolverine: The Long Night as Logan / Wolverine
 2019: Wolverine: The Lost Trail as Logan / Wolverine

Video games
 2022: Total War: Warhammer III as Be'lakor

Awards and nominations

Honours
 He was awarded the Honorary degree of Doctor of Letters (D.Litt.) by the University of Leicester on 22 July 2022.

References

External links

 
 

1971 births
Living people
20th-century English male actors
21st-century English male actors
English male film actors
English male Shakespearean actors
English male stage actors
English male television actors
People from Leicester
People educated at Pattison College
Alumni of the London Academy of Music and Dramatic Art
Male actors from Leicestershire
People from Blaby District
Royal Shakespeare Company members